Rob Fusari, also known as 8Bit, is an American record producer and songwriter. He has worked with Beyoncé, Kelly Rowland, Will Smith, Whitney Houston and Lady Gaga.

Early life
Rob Fusari was born between 1967 and 1968, and raised in Livingston, New Jersey. A child prodigy, Fusari won numerous piano competitions at Radio City Music Hall at 8 years old.

Career
Fusari began writing songs while a student at William Paterson University. He started recording demos, and subsequently met hit songwriter Irwin Levine, who was known for writing "Tie a Yellow Ribbon Round the Ole Oak Tree" and several other hits for Tony Orlando & Dawn.

In the late 1990s, Fusari became producing partners with Vincent Herbert. It was at this time that he wrote his first #1 hit single, "No, No, No", which launched Destiny Child's career. In 2001, Fusari produced "Bootylicious" for the group's third studio album Survivor. The song also peaked at number 1 on the U.S. Billboard Hot 100. In 1999, Fusari produced Will Smith's successful single "Wild Wild West" from the film of the same name.

In 2002, he produced the songs "Train on a Track" by Kelly Rowland and Whitney Houston's "Love That Man", which were both released as singles to varying degrees of success in 2003. The same year, Fusari first worked with Britney Spears on a track titled "Love's Supposed 2 Be", which failed to be included on In the Zone. 

In 2008, Fusari served as producer on Gaga's Grammy-winning debut album, The Fame. He produced and is credited on five songs: "Paparazzi", "Beautiful, Dirty, Rich", "Again Again", "Brown Eyes" and "Disco Heaven". Fusari also produced and co-wrote "Vanity", "Glitter & Grease", and "Retro Dance Freak".

In 2012, he started an independent music label, Last Quarter Records which is based in New York City. Fusari is currently signed to Sony ATV Publishing.

In May 2016, ABC's follow-up to the classic The Lexicon of Love album was released called The Lexicon of Love II. Fusari co-wrote  "Confessions of a Fool", "Singer Not the Song" and "The Ship of the Seasick Sailor" with lead singer Martin Fry. The album entered the UK album charts at #5, the band's first UK Top 10 release since 1990. Fusari toured with ABC on their Lexicon of Love II UK Tour (with full orchestra conducted by Anne Dudley), autumn 2016. In December Fusari and Fry wrote and produced ABC's first ever Christmas song "A Christmas We Deserve" together. BBC Radio 2 put it on the A-list upon release.

Production discography

References

External links
 Official Website

1960s births
Living people
Year of birth missing (living people)
William Paterson University alumni
American people of Italian descent
Record producers from New Jersey
People from Livingston, New Jersey
Songwriters from New Jersey